The eighth and final season of Chinese television series Singer (previously titled I Am a Singer) was broadcast on Hunan Television between February and April 2020. Singer 2020 was produced by Hong Tao, and its music director was Hong Kong senior musician Kubert Leung. The season premiere was first taped on January 3, 2020, and it was announced that the season will be subtitled Year of the Hits, and this was the second season to feature returning contestants, after season five. For the first time in this series, return performances were absent for the entire season. The season premiered on February 7, 2020, and ended on April 24, 2020.

Hua Chenyu, a Chinese singer who previously competed in season six, was named the winner, making him the first previous season returnee to win I Am a Singer, while Tia Ray and Jam Hsiao, both also previously returning singers from season five, finished second and third respectively. This is also the first time none of any new initial singers (outside returning singers) made it to the final round. Additionally, runner-up Ray's became the highest-placing singer who was previously eliminated and advanced via the Breakout round following Aska Yang and Gary Chaw, who also made it to the final round not higher than third place, and Sitar Tan and Lao Lang, both not higher than fourth place.

On 22 September 2020, Hong Tao announced that they would not be renewing the show for a ninth season and cancelled the series, making Singer 2020 the final season of the series.

Competition rules
Like the previous seasons of I Am a Singer and Singer, it features five rounds of two stages, Qualifier and Knockout, with seven singers performing for a 500-member audience each week. The electronic voting, first appeared as a pre-voting twist in season six and introduced permanently on season seven, where voting (up to three votes) was conducted throughout the performance and accounted for 50% of the final score. As such for past seasons, the scores from both weeks are combined to decide the eliminated singer who received the fewest votes. Unlike the last season, separate scores for paper and electronic votes are not revealed.

The competition reverted to the pre-season three format with Challenge rounds (a round which featured a new singer requiring to rank in the top four to avoid elimination) removed, but instead replaced with a variant round known as Surprise, which in-turn functions similarities to the Substituted singers as well. Three new singers were introduced at the start of the Qualifier round and along with the managers; while on backstage, the singers watched their performance while seated with a microphone stand lever. During the performance, a contestant may pull the lever to issue a challenge to the current contestant, but any current contestants are not aware from their existence until the performance ended. After the challenger performed, an electronic vote will immediately conduct with the results being revealed afterwards (previously after the episode prior to the first round). All three Surprise challenges do not need to be performed on a single episode, but challengers must challenge to a singer within the current elimination round. If at least one challenger succeed in the Surprise round, one contestant from the current lineup will be eliminated at the end of the current Knockout round; if multiple challengers succeed, a re-vote will conduct between the successful singers and the singer with a higher vote advance will replace the eliminated singer, but all successful singers, regardless if they lose the revote will be guaranteed a place in the Breakout round. If all three challengers were unsuccessful, all seven contestants are safe from elimination itself. The final round features a small change in which the Challengers were reduced to two, and no re-vote was conducted for multiple successful singers, meaning that the singers are immediately advanced to the competition and eliminations are conducted as usual. A variant of this twist also apply on the Breakout and Grand Finals where singers who lost the duel were eliminated from the competition regardless of the outcome of the round.

As the season is subtitled Year of the Hits, the contest is suggested for a pool of younger singing talents with an age range of 18 and 35. Contestants are no longer restricted to the songs selection, and may freely choose a song they composed on their own or on someone else.

Postponement of premiere and COVID-19 pandemic

Like most episodes of I Am a Singer, each episode began taping one week before the airing of the episode. The season began filming on January 3, 2020, with a premiere date announced on January 10; however, the premiere was rescheduled to January 31 to avoid clashing with the Chinese New Year holiday. On January 29, Mango TV announced that the show will be postponed for a week to February 7 due to the ongoing COVID-19 pandemic, and production was postponed until further notice.

After the first Knockout round, all singers returned to their home countries (Hua, Huang and Ray in Beijing, Zhou in Shanghai, Hsiao and Hsu in Taipei, and Misia in Tokyo) to record their performances, known as a "cloud recording"; the host for the first two episodes, Jam Hsiao, was replaced by his manager, Eliza Liang as the host for the remainder of the season, besides Surprise singers, the studio band ensemble, and host Hong Tao, who were the only members present in the studio premises. All of the performances were either pre-recorded or performed live, and results were instead shown through a remote video conference between host Hong Tao and the singers.

Production resumed on February 17, 2020, with further measures enacted such as staggered filming dates. The returning performance for Mao Buyi planned for week three (who was eliminated after the second week) was cancelled, making it the first time eliminated singers (outside previously withdrawn singers) were not given Return performances. The 500-member audience were also absent but instead viewed through live-stream and had votes cast via the Mango TV special livestream website or through their mobile application. These changes were initially enacted until the third Knockout rounds where Mainland Chinese singers were allowed to return to the studios, but other singers remained on their respective cities till the end of the season.

On the finals on April 24 when the show resumed live audience, though safe distancing measures were taken effect. During the finale, host He Jiong revealed the information that the 251 members of the 500-member audience undergo a DNA testing and safety checks before being permitted entry to the studios, while the remaining members watched and judged the performances online.

Almost all of the episodes (with the exception for the tenth week) were delayed from the scheduled time slot at 8.00pm (7.30pm in the finals) due to the extended coverage by Xinwen Lianbo.

Contestants
The following Singer 2020 contestants are listed in alphabetical order. Singers without a placement for the final are listed as finalists and singers who withdrew are listed as withdrawn.

Key:
 – Winner
 – Runner-up
 – Third place
 – Other finalist
 – Eliminated (not eligible for Breakouts)

Unless otherwise stated, Surprise challenge singers were assigned with temporary music partners, either Jeffery G (round 2 and 3) or Kuo Tao (round 4 or 5). Singers who were not assigned to their partners were reflected as N/A in the Music Partner column.

New singers
The list only shows successful Surprise Challengers and other contestants with qualifying status.

Returning singers
This is the second season to feature former I Am a Singer contestants returning to the competition, after season five. All four singers were given Initial singer status.

Non-contestants
The list of all contesting singers who appeared, but lost in their respective Surprise Challenge, are listed in the table. All of these singers only appeared for one week and were ineligible for the breakouts.

Results

Notes

References

Singer (TV series)
2020 in Chinese music
2020 Chinese television seasons
Television series impacted by the COVID-19 pandemic